Mount Gambier is the second most populated city in South Australia, with an estimated urban population of 33,233 . The traditional owners of the area are the Bungandidj (or Boandik) people. Mount Gambier is the most important settlement in the Limestone Coast region and the seat of government for both the City of Mount Gambier and the District Council of Grant.

The city is well known for its geographical features, particularly its volcanic and limestone features, most notably Blue Lake / Warwar, and its parks, gardens, caves and sinkholes.

History
Before British colonisation of South Australia, the Bungandidj (or Boandik) people were the original Aboriginal inhabitants of the area. They referred to the peak of the volcanic mountain as 'ereng balam' or 'egree belum', meaning 'home of the eagle hawk', but the mountain itself was called Berrin. The sinkhole in the township was referred to as "thu-ghee".

The peak of the dormant Mount Gambier crater was sighted in 1800 by Lieutenant James Grant from the survey brig, HMS Lady Nelson, and named after Lord James Gambier, Admiral of the Fleet. It was the first place named by the British in what was later to become the colony of South Australia. The peak is marked by Centenary Tower, built in 1901 to commemorate the first sighting by colonists.

In 1839, Stephen Henty, one of the Henty brothers who occupied large landholdings at Portland and Merino, led an overland expedition to explore the Mount Gambier region. He was the first white man to climb the peak and view the blue crater lake.

The Henty brothers subsequently laid claim to Mount Gambier in 1842 and established a sheep station there. Conflict with the local Aboriginal residents quickly ensued that same year with Henty's men shooting a number and burning their corpses. In March 1844, a band of Aboriginal people led by Koort Kirrup took a large number of Henty's sheep. Henty's men pursued and engaged them in a prolonged skirmish which resulted in the colonists having to retreat. Other British pastoralists and their shepherds in the region were being robbed, speared and murdered by the local Aboriginal population and they proposed to form hunting parties to shoot them indiscriminately. After the Aboriginal population destroyed between 200 and 300 sheep, the Henty brothers were forced to abandon the Mount Gambier property later in 1844 with significant loss of capital.

Evelyn Sturt, the brother of the explorer Charles Sturt soon took up the leasehold, establishing himself at nearby Compton and bringing 500 cattle and 3000 sheep to pasture at Mount Gambier. Sturt claimed he was able to control the Bungandidj people by "a good rifle aimed by a correct eye". In May 1845, seven armed colonists pursued Aboriginal groups after livestock were taken. In late 1845, the first police station at Mount Gambier was formed. In 1846, the South Australian Mounted Police were involved in an affray with the Aborigines, shooting one and wounding another two. In 1847, Aboriginal people speared cattle and threatened to spear Sturt. Subsequently, Corporal McCulloch and his troopers went on a mission to disperse them. In November, two police and three men tracked a group of Aboriginal people who had taken about 300 sheep to the coast. In their attempt to handcuff them, spears were thrown at them, and during the ensuring fight, four were shot dead.

Industries soon began to appear. The Post Office opened on 22 September 1846,
an Afro-American named John Byng built the Mount Gambier Hotel in 1847, and Dr Edward Wehl arrived in 1849 to begin a flour-milling operation.

From 1861 to 1878 the Post Office was known by this name before reverting to Mount Gambier.
Local government appeared in 1863 when Dr Wehl, who now owned a substantial millhouse on Commercial Road, was elected chairman of the District Council of Mount Gambier. In December 1864 this became the District Council of Mount Gambier West and, at the same time, a separate District Council of Mount Gambier East was formed.

Incorporation in 1876 saw a further division, with the creation of the Town Council and Mr John Watson elected Mayor. Mount Gambier was governed in this fashion until 1932, when the District Council of East and West merged to form a single District Council of Mount Gambier once more.

On 9 December 1954, Mount Gambier was officially declared a city, and is now an important tourism centre in south-east South Australia.

 the town has not been officially dual-named, but the lakes and several other culturally significant features of the location were given dual names in February 2022, and dual naming is being planned for the city, mostly likely as Berrin, the name by which it is known to the local Indigenous community.

Geography

Mount Gambier's urban area is located mainly along the northern slopes and plain of a maar volcano of the same name, Mount Gambier. Comprising several craters, it is part of the Newer Volcanics Province complex of volcanoes. One of these contains a huge lake of high-quality artesian drinking water which changes colour with the seasons. In winter, it is a steel grey and then changes to a spectacular cobalt blue in the summer, giving rise to its name, Blue Lake. There are several other craters in the city including Valley Lake and the Leg of Mutton River. The region surrounding the city also includes other volcanic features such as Mount Schank, along with many karst features such as water-filled caves, cenotès and sinkholes.

Mount Gambier’s urban area encompasses the City of Mount Gambier and parts of the District Council of Grant. The city’s metropolitan area includes the following suburbs: Mount Gambier CBD (inner-city suburb), Suttontown (north-western suburb), Wandilo (north-western suburb), Mil-Lel (northern suburb), Worrolong (north-eastern suburb), Glenburnie (eastern suburb), Yahl (south-eastern suburb), Compton (western suburb), Moorak (southern suburb), Square Mile (south-eastern suburb), and OB Flat (south-eastern suburb).

Climate
Mount Gambier experiences a temperate mediterranean climate, with mild, relatively dry summers with very cool nights; mild springs and autumns with moderate rainfall; and cool winters with high rainfall. July is the wettest month with an average of 100.5 mm falling on a staggering 21.9 days, whereas February normally records the lowest rainfall with an average of 26.6 mm on only 7.8 days. The highest temperature recorded in Mount Gambier was 45.9 °C on 20 December 2019 and the lowest temperature recorded was −3.9 °C on 20 June 1950 and 2 July 1960. Mount Gambier only has 40.5 clear days on an annual basis. Summers (and likewise annual mean temperatures) are cool for the latitude on account of its exposure to the prevailing westerly belt. Extreme summer minima near  are especially of note, as these are unheard of in northern hemisphere locations at a similar latitude and near the coast at sea-level.

Governance

Council Chamber in the Civic Centre at 10 Watson Terrace, Mount Gambier is the seat of local government for the City of Mount Gambier. The council was created in 1932 when the District Council of Mount Gambier West and District Council of Mount Gambier East merged to become the District Council of Mount Gambier which was later proclaimed a city on 9 December 1954. The city consists of a mayor and ten councillors, elected equally from the East and West wards once every four years by postal voting. The Mayor of Mount Gambier council is Lynette Martin. The local government area is situated entirely within the District Council of Grant and due to the city's growth there have been ongoing talks of amalgamation, the most recent boundary changes taking place in 2010.

Law and order for the Limestone Coast region is maintained via the Mount Gambier Police Complex at 42 Bay Road Mount Gambier, the Mount Gambier Magistrates Court at 41 Bay Road Mount Gambier and the Mount Gambier Prison at Moorak south of the city.

In state politics, Mount Gambier is located in the South Australian House of Assembly electoral district of Mount Gambier, which has been held since 2014 by former Liberal Party member Troy Bell, who was re-elected as an independent in the 2018 state election.

In federal politics, Mount Gambier is located in the Australian House of Representatives division of Barker, which has been represented by Tony Pasin since 2013. It is a safe Liberal Party of Australia seat.

Demographics

According to the 2021 Census the population of the Mount Gambier census area was 25,591 people, making it the largest urban area in the state outside Adelaide. Approximately 52% of the population were female, 82.8% were Australian born, over 91.5% of residents were Australian citizens and 2.8% were indigenous.

The most popular industries for employment were Log Sawmilling and Timber Dressing (8%), School Education (4.8%) and Retail Trade (3.8%), while the unemployment rate is approx. 7%. The median weekly household income is A$814 or more per week, compared with $924 in Adelaide.

Also according to the 2021 Census 52.0% of residents identified themselves as having 'No Religion'. The largest religious denominations represented were Catholics at 14.4%, Anglicans at 6.1%, and Uniting Church at 4.3%.

As of 2020 it is the second most populated city in South Australia, and the 47th largest city in Australia, with an estimated urban population of 29,946. 

A 1976 study found that less than 10 per cent (around 160 people) of residents aged over 65 had lived in the area for less than 5 years, leading to a lack of specific aged-care facilities. The same source claimed "The government in the south-east area of the state, consisting of three local councils, amounted to a single administration. In consequence, many residents of Victoria used to look across the border to Mount Gambier as their centre. Consequently, during the 1970s many elderly locals relocated to Victor Harbor and Moonta, both rural areas but with more resources available to cope with an ageing population".

Economy
The economy of Mount Gambier is driven by all three economic sectors, though it has emerged as a regional service economy with its main industry being the service industry and its key areas of business including tourism, hospitality, retail, professional services, government administration and education. The city's historic primary sector roots including mining, agriculture and forestry continue to play a key role as well as being a major road transport and trucking centre.

Tourism 

Mount Gambier is the major service centre for the tourism region known as The Limestone Coast. The area has many natural attractions, including volcanic craters, lakes, limestone caves, sinkholes, underground aquifers and stunning Cenotès, surrounded by a city with a wide range of accommodation, shopping and entertainment opportunities. Tourism generates around $100 million for the Mount Gambier economy. The city is a major accommodation gateway for the region. Major tourism attractions include the Blue Lake and Valley Lake wildlife park, and caves such as Umpherston Sinkhole / Balumbul, Cave Garden / Thugi and Engelbrecht Cave. Engelbrecht Cave is a popular cave diving venue. The region around Mount Gambier also has many water-filled cenotès, caves and sinkholes which attract cave divers from around the world.

Service industries

As a major service centre for the region, the city has several key retail districts including the Commercial Street CBD. Mount Gambier Marketplace, opened in August 2012, is one of three major shopping centres in the city, the other two being Mount Gambier Central (formerly known as Centro Mount Gambier) and Coles shopping complex on Ferrers Street, which was opened in December 2020.

Major department stores include Big W, Kmart and Harvey Norman. Additionally each of the major supermarkets Aldi, Coles (both replaced Target which closed in May 2019), Woolworths, Foodland and IGA are represented. Other retailers in Mount Gambier include Bunnings Warehouse, Mitre 10, Dan Murphy's, Spotlight, BCF and Dimmeys, 

Servicing the financial sector are branches of the big four Australian retail banks, National Australia Bank, ANZ, Commonwealth Bank and Westpac along with Bendigo & Adelaide Bank, People's Choice Credit Union, St George Bank and a number of smaller independent financial services firms.

In December 2020, the first Australian regional Krispy Kreme store was opened in the city.

Arts and culture 

The city's civic centre is in the refurbished and extended old town hall and Institute buildings. A cinema was operated in the early 1950s in this building by D. Clifford Theatres.

Located around Cave Gardens, is the hub of the city's arts and includes the Riddoch Art Gallery, South Australia's major regional art gallery. It also houses the University of South Australia's James Morrison Academy. The complex was extended in 2011 to include "The Main Corner", a modern building which includes a theatre. Nearby are the public library, a cafe next to the library and the old post office.

Music
Every year the town and the surrounding area, hosts nearly 7,000 secondary school musicians for the Generations in Jazz Festival. Jazz artists like James Morrison, Ross Irwin, and Graeme Lyall travel to perform and adjudicate the stage band competition. Special guests have included Gordon Goodwin and his Big Phat Band, Whycliffe Gordon and recently (2017) the Adelaide Symphony Orchestra.

Media

Newspapers 
The local newspaper for Mount Gambier, Limestone Coast and South East region of South Australia was The Border Watch. It was published and available in the local area every Tuesday through Friday (with the exception of some public holidays such as Christmas Day). Daily newspapers from Melbourne (Herald Sun and The Age) and Adelaide (The Advertiser) as well as national newspapers such as The Australian and Australian Financial Review are also available. Some newspapers from nearby towns such as Millicent and Penola, specialty newspapers like the British International Express weekly newspaper, agricultural newspapers such as The Weekly Times newspaper from Victoria and The South Australian Stock Journal (published by Australian Community Media) and The Independent Weekly from Adelaide are also available from local newsagents.

Historically, the town was served by multiple newspapers. Two earlier papers, the biweekly Mount Gambier Standard (3 May 1866 – 1874), and the South Eastern Star (2 October 1877 – 13 October 1930), were taken over by The Border Watch. Another, the South-Eastern Ensign (2 July 1875 – 30 June 1876), was also briefly printed. Later, a free commercial paper, the Exchange (1902– 8 October 1942) ran in opposition to the Watch, and was published by the Clark family. However, it ceased when the Second World War caused paper restrictions and a decline in advertising.

On 21 August 2020, The Border Watch was discontinued after 159 years of publishing, due to financial circumstances during the COVID-19 pandemic.

Television
 The Australian Broadcasting Corporation (ABC) – ABC, ABC TV Plus/ABC Kids, ABC Me, ABC News (digital channels)
 The Special Broadcasting Service (SBS) – SBS, SBS Viceland, SBS World Movies, SBS Food, SBS WorldWatch, NITV (digital channels)
 WIN Television (7, 9 & 10) as SES-8 and MGS-41 – SES-8 relays the programming from Seven Network (Seven SA), Nine Network (Nine SA) & Network 10 (10 SA).
 Foxtel – Subscription Television service Foxtel is also available via satellite.

Channel Nine broadcasts Nine Network programming, Channel Seven broadcasts Seven Network programming & WIN Television broadcasts Network 10 programming. The programming schedules for these channels is the same as Channel Nine, Channel Seven and Channel 10 in Adelaide, with local commercials inserted and some variations for coverage of Australian Football League or National Rugby League matches, state and national news and current affairs programs, some lifestyle and light entertainment shows and infomercials. As of February 2013, there are no local news programs for the Mount Gambier area since the closure of WIN Television's news operation. WIN Television also broadcasts Sky News Regional programming, the programming schedule for these multichannel is the same as Sky News Australia and Fox Sports News, with local commercials inserted.

On 11 November 2011, WIN Television commenced transmission of the digital TV multi-channels 10 Bold, 10 Peach, 9Go!, 9Gem, 7two (an acronym of "72") and 7mate for Mount Gambier and the surrounding South East region of South Australia.

Due to the close proximity to the Victoria/South Australia state border, most people in Mount Gambier and some adjacent areas of southeast South Australia can receive television services from Western Victoria. These channels are broadcast from the Mount Dundas transmitter near the town of Cavendish, Victoria. The transmitter site is located approximately 100 kilometres northeast of Mount Gambier and broadcasts all the television channels from Western Victoria including Prime7 Television (AMV), WIN Television Victoria (VTV), Southern Cross 10 (BCV), the ABC and SBS Victorian services, as well as the digital free-to-air multi-channels that are also now available from the Mount Burr transmitter, north west of Mount Gambier.

Radio 
ABC
 ABC South East SA (1476 AM)
 ABC South East SA (1161 AM, Naracoorte)
 ABC Triple J (102.5 FM)
 ABC Radio National (103.3 FM)
 ABC Classic FM (104.1 FM)
 ABC NewsRadio (105.7 FM)
Commercial
 Radio TAB
 Triple M Limestone Coast (963 AM)
 SAFM (96.1 FM) (formerly Hit 96.1)
 5GTR FM (100.1 FM)
 LIME FM (104.9 FM) (Formerly Rhema FM)

Some ABC radio services can also be received from the nearby town of Naracoorte and from Western Victoria.

Sport 

There are four Australian rules football teams competing in the Western Border Football League: North Gambier, East Gambier, South Gambier and West Gambier. They have produced such AFL players as David Marshall, Nick Daffy and Matthew Clarke.

There is also a range of different sporting leagues and clubs in Mount Gambier and surrounding regions, including soccer, netball, basketball, tennis, hockey, cricket, swimming, cycling, triathlon, rifle, gun and pistol shooting, lawn bowls, ten-pin bowling, angling, archery and golf.

Motor sport is also popular, with the main facilities being the McNamara Park road racing circuit, and the Borderline Speedway, a  dirt track oval speedway nicknamed "The Bullring". Borderline Speedway hosts an annual Sprintcar event called the "Kings Challenge", first run in 1995 and is held in January each year a week before the Grand Annual Sprintcar Classic in nearby Warrnambool (Victoria), and two weeks before the Australian Sprintcar Championship. Borderline has played host to many Australian and South Australian speedway championships throughout its over 50-year history and is regarded as one of the best run and promoted speedways in Australia. The speedway is currently managed and promoted by former star sprintcar driver, Mount Gambier native Bill Barrows. In 2007, Borderline hosted the fifth and final round of the Australian Solo Championship. The round and the championship was won by Australia's own reigning World Champion Jason Crump.

Mount Gambier is the home of "The Alex Roberts 100 Mile Classic", a cycling event that lays claim to the longest continuing open cycling event in South Australia. The event held annually by the Mount Gambier Cycling Club.

The Mount Gambier Greyhound Racing Club hold greyhound racing meetings at a purpose-built complex called the Tara Raceway, at 161 Lake Terrace East. The Club moved from Glenburnie Racecourse in late 1996 and held its first meeting on Saturday 25 January 1997.

Mount Gambier Gift 
The 120m Mount Gambier Gift was held annually on the first Saturday in December at Vansittart Oval was the 2nd richest professional footrace in South Australia. Resurrected in 2001 the athletic carnival includes races from 70m to 1600m and attracts athletes from all over Australia, mostly from South Australia and Victoria. Of the eleven Mount Gambier athletic carnivals held to date, three Victorians have won the 120 m Gift. On 3 December 2011, 21-year-old Wallace Long-Scafidi won the Gift for the second year in a row. The race has not been held since 2012, and to this date continues to go unheld.

Mount Gambier Pioneers Basketball Club 
The Mount Gambier Pioneers Basketball Club are the city's only representative team to participate in a national competition. The Pioneers entered the South Eastern Basketball League in 1988 and currently play in the NBL1 South Conference, the second tier competition underneath Basketball Australia's premier elite professional competition the Australian NBL.

Infrastructure

Health 
The city has a major regional hospital, Mount Gambier Hospital out of which operates the Mount Gambier and Districts Health Service. Additionally there are a number of private health services including the Mount Gambier Private Hospital (now closed).

Utilities 
The city's main catchment is the Blue Lake, the volcano lake is both a tourist attraction and the city's main reservoir. Water supply, sewage collection and disposal are provided by South East Catchment Water Management Board.

Education 
There are six Reception to Year 6 (R-6) Primary schools:
Reidy Park Primary School;
McDonald Park;
Compton Primary School;
Melaleuca Park;
Mulga Street Primary School;
Mount Gambier North Primary School.

There are two Reception to Year 12 (R-12) colleges:
 Tenison Woods College
 St Martins Lutheran College.

There are two high schools for Year 7 to 12:
 Mount Gambier High School
 Grant High School.

Post-secondary education is offered by the following providers:
 TAFE South Australia has a campus in Mount Gambier providing an extensive variety of vocational study.
 University of South Australia has a modern, state of the art campus in Mount Gambier which offers full-time or part-time undergraduate degrees in Education, Nursing, Midwifery and Social Work with enabling courses in Foundation Studies and Aboriginal Pathways Program also offered.
 Flinders University also operates Flinders Rural Health SA in the grounds of Mount Gambier Hospital.

Transport 
Mount Gambier sits on a number of highways which connect the city to other major towns in the region, as well as to Adelaide and Melbourne.
 Princes Highway (Jubilee Highway) travels through the city east to west.
  to Melbourne via Dartmoor, Portland and Warrnambool
  to Adelaide via Millicent, Kingston SE and Meningie
 Riddoch Highway (Penola / Bay Road) travels through the city north to south.
  to Adelaide via Naracoorte and Keith
  to Port Macdonnell

Before conversion of the Adelaide–Wolseley railway line to standard gauge in 1995, Mount Gambier was connected to Adelaide on the broad gauge network via Naracoorte, Bordertown and Tailem Bend. Normal commercial passenger services to Adelaide ceased on 31 December 1990, while limited freight services operated until the line was disconnected from the national network on 12 April 1995. Limestone Coast Railway operated tourist trains to Coonawarra, Penola, Millicent, Tantanoola and Rennick until it ceased on 28 June 2006. In 2015, the former railyards were converted into a park.

Mount Gambier Airport is located a few kilometres north of the city via the Riddoch Highway. The city is served by Rex Airlines, which flies Saab 340 aircraft to Adelaide and Melbourne up to three times per day. Since March 2021, Qantas operates one daily flight to and from Adelaide and Melbourne using De Havilland Canada Dash 8 aircraft in QantasLink livery.

Stateliner operate coach services to Mount Gambier from Adelaide. V/Line operates a daily interstate coach service from Mount Gambier to Warrnambool, connecting with a rail service to Melbourne. The Mount Gambier Visitor Centre (formally known as The Lady Nelson) is an agent for public passenger services tickets sales, and the services use the car park to arrive and depart from.

Notable people 
 Kasey Chambers (born there in 1976)
 George Crennan, Director of the Federal Catholic Immigration Office in Australia from 1949 until 1995
 Gavin Wanganeen (AFL Footballer) (born there in 1973)
 Elizabeth Grant, (born there in 1963 and lived there until 1980).
 Dave Graney (born there in 1959 and lived there until 1978)
 Mark Yeates (AFL Footballer) (born there 1960)
 Robert Helpmann (Sir) (1909-1986)
 David Marshall (Australian footballer with the Adelaide Crows in the AFL, Glenelg in the SANFL, North Gambier in the WBFL)
 Tony Pasin Liberal politician
 Allan Scott (1923-2008, businessman)
 James Stein pioneer overlander and pastoralist, died and buried there 1877.
 John Tremelling Olympian.
 Josip Skoko Socceroo - 51 Caps.
 William Paltridge politician.
 Matthew Clarke Australian Footballer
 Nick Daffy Australian Footballer
 Lucas Herbert Australian Footballer
 Simon Feast Australian Footballer
 Gary Lazarus Australian Footballer
 Tim O'Brien (footballer) Australian Footballer
 Brad Close Australian Footballer

References

External links 

City of Mount Gambier
Discover Mount Gambier - Mount Gambier tourism website

 
Cities in South Australia
Mount Gambier
Populated places established in 1854
1854 establishments in Australia